The 1978 Swedish Open was a men's tennis tournament played on outdoor clay courts held in Båstad, Sweden. It was part of the 1978 Grand Prix circuit. It was the 31st edition of the tournament and was held from 17 July through 23 July 1978. First-seeded Björn Borg won the singles title, his second at the event after 1974.

Finals

Singles

 Björn Borg defeated  Corrado Barazzutti 6–1, 6–2
 It was Borg's 8th singles title of the year and the 38th of his career.

Doubles

 Bob Carmichael /  Mark Edmondson defeated  Péter Szőke /  Balázs Taróczy 7–5, 6–4

References

External links
 ITF tournament editions details

Swedish Open
Swedish Open
Swedish Open
Swedish Open